Lev Abramovich Dodin (born 1944) is a modern  Russian theater director, the leader of Saint Petersburg Maly Drama Theater.

Biography
Lev Dodin was born in Novokuznetsk in 1944. He first experienced theatrical production as a child at the Theater of Youth Creativity (1957-1962) directed by Matvey Dubrovin. Studied at Leningrad State Institute of Theatre, Music and Cinema under Boris Sohn and Georgy Tovstonogov which he graduated in 1966.

Between 1966 and 1982 he was a guest director in different theaters of Russia and abroad including Theater of Youth Creativity, Gorky Theater, MKhAT, Finnish National Theatre, Salzburg Festival, Florence Musical May festival, Milan La Scala.

In 1975 he started his work at Maly Drama Theatre. In 1982 he became the artistic director of the theatre and has led the theatre since then.

Among Dodin' major works are:
Brothers and Sisters by Fedor Abramov - a monumental show more than 8 hours long;
The House by Fedor Abramov
Lord of the Flies by William Golding
Stars in the Morning Sky by Alexander Galin
Chevengur by Andrei Platonov
The Devils by Fyodor Dostoevsky
The Cherry Orchard by Anton Chekhov
Hamlet by William Shakespeare

and many others.

Europe Theatre Prize
In 2000, he was awarded the VIII Europe Theatre Prize, with the following reason:
A student of one of Stanislavsky's most faithful followers, Lev Dodin left his native Siberia for the old cities of former Russia when he was very young. He has devoted his life to a teaching method that is never separated from practice, and this was his starting point for founding a company that was seen as an extended family, with a belief in ensemble performances and workshops, even before he was called upon to direct the Maly in 1983 and make it a leading theatre in the last decades of the twentieth century. The House was born as a play for his group, who graduated from the Drama School in St. Petersburg, after months spent in the northern village where Feodor Abramov wrote his novel on the trials and tribulations of peasant life. It was adapted for the stage by using improvisation to render the actual true-to-life atmosphere to be found in Brothers and Sisters. This tragic epic of the kolkhoz, inspired by the author himself in the mid-eighties, takes place in the space of eight emotional hours of tears and laughter and plumbs the depths of the "great Russian soul", which is one of the director's favourite subjects, together with the controversial analysis of the history of his country, especially through the adaptation of novels for the theatre. The culmination of this was the staging of a Dostoevsky classic that had long been banned, The Devils, which he rehearsed for three years and was staged regularly by the Maly company for nine years in ten-hour performances of thrilling words and actions. These already imply a discourse on the revolutionary spirit of a people that serves as an introduction to the metaphor of the suicidal utopia expressed in Andrei Platonov's Cevengur, the recent stage masterpiece floating on water, and the Untitled Play by Chekhov, translated by Dodin into a dance through the twentieth century. Gaudeamus, on the contrary, is set on a snowy stage and is the first of the plays produced with the Drama School students. It is a satire on Russian training for military service that unfortunately remains very topical today, and is part of the repertoire that focuses on contemporary man, which the company offers to its public worldwide, thus restoring to us a sense of the necessity for the theatre.

Honours and awards
 Order of Merit for the Fatherland, 3rd and 4th classes
 Officer of the Order of Arts and Letters (France)
 People's Artist of the Russian Federation
 Russian Federation State Prize, twice (1992 and 2003).
 Prize of the President of the Russian Federation
 USSR State Prize
 2000 Europe Theatre Prize

Bibliography

References

External links
Dodin's page on his theater site

Russian theatre directors
1944 births
Living people
Recipients of the Order "For Merit to the Fatherland", 3rd class
People's Artists of Russia
Honorary Members of the Russian Academy of Arts
Officiers of the Ordre des Arts et des Lettres
State Prize of the Russian Federation laureates
Recipients of the USSR State Prize
Soviet theatre directors
People from Novokuznetsk